Kloosia is a genus of European non-biting midges in the subfamily Chironominae of the bloodworm family Chironomidae.

Species
K. pusilla (Linnaeus, 1761)

References

Chironomidae
Diptera of Europe